Rick Brant (Born September 27, 1967) is a Mohawk athlete who primarily competed in track and field (middle distance). Brant is a Tom Longboat winner, winning the National award in 1987. He is originally from Ontario and a member of the Mohawks of the Bay of Quinte First Nation He now resides in Cowichan British Columbia. Brant is most recently known for his contribution in being a founding member of the Aboriginal Sports Circle, Executive Director of the Indigenous Sport Physical Activity and Recreation Council (I·SPARC) and CEO of three separate North American Indigenous Games (NAIG) - 1993, 1997 and 2008. Brant served as President of the North American Indigenous Games Council (the international governing body for the NAIG) from 2015 to 2018. He continues to serve on the Council's Executive Committee as Past President.

Athletic career 

Brant was a part of Canada's National Track and Field and Cross Country teams. He was a National Champion at 800 meters, 4x400 meter relay and team cross country. In 1984, Brant won the "Most Improved Athlete" while he was a member of the Ottawa Lions Track and Field Club. In 1986, Brant was a part of the University of Ottawa's Cross Country team that participated in the OUA and CIS championships. In 2008, Brant's former high school in Ottawa, Brookfield, inducted him into the wall of fame for his track and field and cross country career. Brant also received the Tom Longboat Award in 1987 for the Most Outstanding Aboriginal Athlete in Canada. Brant's notable athletic accomplishments include:

1986 - 1988	Carded athlete and member of Canada’s National Track and Field Team
		
1988		Saskatchewan Indoor Track and Field Athlete of the Year

1987  - 1988	Provincial 800 meter Champion for the Provinces of Saskatchewan, British Columbia, and Manitoba

1987	        CIAU All Canadian – University Indoor Track and Field Championships 4x400 metre relay Champions

1987		Tom Longboat Award - Most Outstanding Canadian Aboriginal Athlete

1987		Espoir Champion - 800 metre - Canada vs. Wales and Ireland

1987		Canadian Challenge Final Champion - 800 meters and Canadian Challenge Final and Most Outstanding Male Athlete

1986		CIAU All Canadian – University Team Cross Country Championship	

1986		National Achievement Award - Ontario Amateur Sport

1986            World Junior Championships - 800 meters Semi Finals

1986		National Junior Champion - 800 meters and 4x400 meter relay

Contribution to sport 

Brant has contributed significantly to Canada's Aboriginal sports system. He is a founding member of the Aboriginal Sports Circle - Canada's National Voice for Aboriginal sport, recreation and physical activity. He served as the Aboriginal Sport Circle's Executive Director from 1998 to 2005. During his time with the Aboriginal Sport Circle he helped lead the revitalization of the Tom Longboat Awards, creation of the National Aboriginal Coaching Awards, creation of the Aboriginal Coaching Modules, and the creation of the National Aboriginal Hockey Championships. Brant has also been closely connected with the North American Indigenous Games movement. He helped found the North American Indigenous Games Council, the international governing body for the North American Indigenous Games, and he has oversaw the delivery of three separate NAIG's - Prince Albert, SK 1993, Victoria, BC 1997, and Cowichan Valley, BC 2008.  Most recently, Brant helped establish the Indigenous Sport Physical Activity and Recreation Council (I·SPARC) of British Columbia and the creation of the Aboriginal Sport, Recreation and Physical Activity Strategy (BC), the first comprehensive/long term strategy of its kind in North America. Brant is the Executive Director of I·SPARC, which is the official Provincial Aboriginal Sport Body for the Province of British Columbia. In 2008 Brant served as the CEO of the Cowichan 2008 North American Indigenous Games. During his time as CEO of Cowichan he had a part in the Legacy Plan (2008) which included; multi-year senior staffing, marketing plan to recognize contribution, funds development strategy, transfer of knowledge oversight plan and use and protection funds policy.

References 

Living people
First Nations sportspeople
Canadian male track and field athletes
Canadian Mohawk people
Sportspeople from Ontario
1967 births